or  is a Kongo-based liturgical language of the Palo religion with origins in Cuba, Dominican Republic and Puerto Rico, later spreading to other countries in the Caribbean Basin. It involves code-switching between Kongo-derived words and phrases; Bozal Spanish, the archaic Spanish creole of the Caribbean slave plantations, or at least an imitation of it; and colloquial Caribbean Spanish. 

It is not secret, but it is intended to be impenetrable to the uninitiated.

See also
Lucumí, a similar liturgical language based on Yoruba

References

Afro-Cuban culture
Bantu-based pidgins and creoles
Kongo language
Languages of Cuba
Languages of the African diaspora
Sacred languages
Caribbean Spanish
Spanish-based pidgins and creoles